Genoplesium clivicola is species of small terrestrial orchid that is endemic to south-eastern Australia. It has a single thin leaf fused to the flowering stem and up to twenty five small, greenish and reddish flowers. It grows in forest and woodland in Victoria, the Australian Capital Territory and New South Wales.

Description
Genoplesium clivicola is a terrestrial, perennial, deciduous, herb with an underground tuber and a single thin leaf fused to the flowering stem. Flowering occurs from January to May.

Taxonomy and naming
Corunastylis clivicola was first formally described in 2007 by David Jones from a specimen collected in the Black Mountain Reserve and the description was published in The Orchadian. In 2014 Julian Shaw changed the name to Genoplesium clivicola. The specific epithet (clivicola) is derived from the Latin word clivus meaning "ascent", "elevation", "hill" or "sloping hillside" with the suffix -cola meaning "dweller".

Distribution and habitat
Genoplesium clivicola grows in Victoria north of the Great Dividing Range, except for a disjunct population in the Brisbane Ranges National Park. In New South Wales it is found on the Central and Southern Tablelands, including the Australian Capital Territory.

References

 

clivicola
Endemic orchids of Australia
Orchids of the Australian Capital Territory
Orchids of New South Wales
Orchids of Victoria (Australia)
Plants described in 2007